The Sound of Revenge is the debut studio album by American rapper Chamillionaire. It was released on November 22, 2005. The album features guest appearances from Lil' Flip, Lil Wayne, Rasaq (his younger brother), Natalie Alvarado, Krayzie Bone, Bun B, Scarface, Billy Cook, Killer Mike and Pastor Troy, with its production handled by Scott Storch, Mannie Fresh, Play-N-Skillz, Cool, and Dre, among others.

The album also has the release of "Chopped and screwed version" by DJ OG Ron C. Chamillionaire and Krayzie Bone won the Best Rap Performance By A Duo or Group Grammy for the song "Ridin'". In 2009, Chamillionaire released Mixtape Messiah 7 and explained on the final track of disc 1 that he was also going to be considered for the Best New Artist Grammy but, bootleggers caused him to be disqualified by releasing unauthorized Chamillionaire albums the same year his debut was released.

The album debuted at number 10 on the US Billboard 200 chart, selling 130,000 copies in its first week, and it later became certified platinum by Recording Industry Association of America (RIAA), selling more than 1.5 million copies in the United States on December 19, of 2005.  By April 3, 2006 the album had sold 2 million copies in the United States. The non-album single, "Picture Perfect", peaked at number 28 on Hot Ringtones.

Track listing

Samples
Picture Perfect
 "Ain't I Been Good to You (Part 1 & 2)" by The Isley Brothers
Think I'm Crazy
 "Everything for Free" by K's Choice
Void in My Life
 "Do What You Do" by Jermaine Jackson

Credits

Producers

 Sol Messiah – Producer
 Sean Blaze – Producer, Engineer, Mixing
 Twinzbeatz & Thundertrax – Producer
 Mannie Fresh – Producer
 Scott Storch – Producer
 Play-N-Skillz - Producer
 Happy Perez – Keyboards, Producer
 Gary Fly – Assistant
 Rick DeVarona – Assistant
 Tony Cavasin – Assistant
 Cool and Dre – Producer

Technical production
 Wayne Allison – Engineer
 Gregg Rominiecki – Engineer
 Conrad Golding – Engineer
 Matt Still – Engineer
 Rodney Maspoch – Engineer
 Taylor Dow – Assistant Engineer
 James Hoover – Engineer, Mixing
 Brian Stanley - Mixing
 Jason Goldstein – Mixing
 Oscar Ramirez – Mixing
 Wassim Zreik – Mixing
 Bram Tobey – Mixing Assistant
 Eric Jensen – Mixing Assistant
 Kathryn Diehl – Mixing Assistant
 Raj Makhija – Mixing Assistant
 Chris Gehringer – Mastering
 Eddy Schreyer – Mastering

Instrumentals/vocals

 Jennifer Rose – Vocals
 Tami Latrell – Vocals (Background)
 Steve Lake – Guitar
 Avery Jones – Bass
 Debra Killings – Bass
 Fitzgerald Lingard – Bass
 Preston Crump – Bass
 Terrence Brown – Keyboards

Art
 Jonathan Mannion – Photography
 Mikee Aguilar – A&R
 Jordan Nixon – A&R
 Nina Freeman – A&R
 Sal Guastella – A&R
 Mike Frost – Art Direction

Charts

Weekly charts

Year-end charts

Certifications

References

Chamillionaire albums
2005 debut albums
Albums produced by Cool & Dre
Albums produced by Happy Perez
Albums produced by Mannie Fresh
Albums produced by Scott Storch
Universal Records albums
Chamillitary Entertainment albums